Pelotón (Spanish for "platoon") is a Chilean reality show on Televisión Nacional de Chile in which the participants undergo an intense regime of military training. The winner receives 50 million pesos. The first season aired January 2 – May 5, 2007, and the second season ran from October 2, 2007, to March 11, 2008. The third season were premiere in July 2009 and the contestants were Chilean celebrities. The third and 4th season were shooting back to back, and like last season the majority of participants were celebrities.

Airing of the show

References

External links 
  

Chilean reality television series
2007 Chilean television series debuts
2010 Chilean television series endings